An air brake or, more formally, a compressed-air-brake system, is a type of friction brake for vehicles in which compressed air pressing on a piston is used to apply the pressure to the brake pad or brake shoe needed to stop the vehicle.  Air brakes are used in large heavy vehicles, particularly those having multiple trailers which must be linked into the brake system, such as  trucks, buses, trailers, and semi-trailers, in addition to their use in railroad trains. George Westinghouse first developed air brakes for use in railway service. He patented a safer air brake on March 5, 1872.  Westinghouse made numerous alterations to improve his air pressured brake invention, which led to various forms of the automatic brake.  In the early 20th century, after its advantages were proven in railway use, it was adopted by manufacturers of trucks and heavy road vehicles.

Design and function
Air brakes are typically used on heavy trucks and buses. A compressed-air-brake system is divided into a supply system and a control system.

The supply system compresses, stores and supplies high-pressure air to the control system as well as to additional air operated auxiliary truck systems (gearbox shift control, clutch pedal air assistance servo, etc.). The air compressor draws filtered air from the atmosphere and compresses it, storing the compressed air in high-pressure reservoirs. Most heavy vehicles have a gauge within the driver's view, indicating the availability of air pressure for safe vehicle operation, often including warning tones or lights. A mechanical "wig wag" that automatically drops down into the driver's field of vision when the pressure drops below a certain point is also common.

The control system consists of service brakes, parking brakes, a control pedal, and an air storage tank. If the vehicle is towing a trailer, it often has a separate trailer-brake system that receives compressed air from the supply system.

The parking brakes use a disc or drum arrangement which is designed to be held in the 'applied' position by spring pressure. Air pressure must be produced to release these "spring brake" parking brakes. Setting the parking/emergency brake releases the pressurized air in the lines between the compressed air storage tank and the brakes, thus allowing the spring actuated parking brake to engage. A sudden loss of air pressure would result in full spring brake pressure immediately.

The service brakes are used while driving for slowing or stopping the vehicle. When the brake pedal is pushed to apply the service brakes, air is routed under pressure from a supply reservoir to the service brake chamber, causing the brake to be engaged. When the pedal is released, a return spring in the brake chamber disengages the brake, and the compressed air is exhausted to the atmosphere. Most types of truck air brakes are drum brakes, though there is an increasing trend towards the use of disc brakes.

Supply system

The air compressor (1) is driven by the engine either by crankshaft pulley via a belt or directly from the engine timing gears. Typically, it is lubricated and cooled by the engine lubrication and cooling systems, but some systems use self-lubricated compressors and/or air-cooled compressors. System pressure is regulated by a governor between a minimum and maximum value; the governor unloads the compressor when the maximum system pressure has been achieved and loads the compressor when it falls below its minimum setpoint.

When the compressor is loaded, compressed air is first routed through a cooling coil and into an air dryer (3) which removes moisture and oil impurities and also may include a pressure regulator (2), safety valve and smaller purge reservoir (4). As an alternative to the air dryer, the supply system can be equipped with an anti-freeze device and oil separator.

The compressed air is then stored in a supply reservoir (6); the supply reservoir, which is physically closest to the compressor, is also called a wet tank because the majority of oil and water from the compressor gather here. A second, downstream reservoir is called the service reservoir, and forms the primary source for brake operation. The supply and service reservoirs are sized to allow several service brake applications if the compressor fails or the engine stops. From the service reservoir, compressed air is then distributed via a four-way protection valve (5) into the primary reservoir (rear brake reservoir) and the secondary reservoir (front/trailer-brake reservoir), a parking-brake reservoir, and an auxiliary air supply distribution point.

The supply system also includes various check, pressure limiting, drain and safety valves.

Control system
The control system is further divided into two service brake-circuits, the parking brake-circuit, and the trailer brake-circuit.

The dual-service brake circuits are further split into front- and rear-wheel circuits which receive compressed air from their individual supply reservoirs for added safety in case of an air leak. The service brakes are applied by means of a brake pedal air valve (9) which regulates both circuits. Depressing the brake pedal allows compressed air stored in the respective supply reservoirs to enter each service brake chamber (10) and (12), causing the service brakes to actuate. Releasing the brake pedal disconnects the supply reservoirs; a brake return spring forces the service brakes to release, and the compressed air that was used to actuate the service brakes is exhausted to the atmosphere. Repeated application of the service brakes will deplete the air reservoir pressure, prompting the governor to load the compressor again.

Relay valve(s) are used to improve brake response with long lines. Routing the lines for the rear and trailer service brakes through the brake pedal air valve could result in unacceptably slow actuation, so these brakes are plumbed directly to the service reservoir through a local relay valve (11) and the line from the brake pedal air valve is used to actuate the relay valve instead of the service brakes. Similarly, quick-release valve(s) are located close to their respective brakes and allow the air to be exhausted more quickly when the brakes are released.

The parking brake is the air operated spring brake type where the brake is applied by spring force in the spring brake cylinder (12) and released by compressed air via a hand-control valve (7).

The trailer brake consists of a direct two-line system: the supply line and the separate control or service line. The supply line receives air from the prime mover park brake air tank via a park brake relay valve and the control line is regulated via the trailer-brake relay valve. The operating signals for the relay are provided by the prime mover brake-pedal air valve, trailer service brake hand control (subject to local heavy vehicle legislation) and the prime mover park brake hand control.

Wig wag
Air-brake systems may include a wig wag device which deploys to warn the driver if the system air pressure drops too low.

This device drops a mechanical arm into view when the pressure in the system drops below the threshold of sufficient pressure to reliably deploy the brakes.

An automatic wig wag will rise out of view when the pressure in the system rises above the threshold. The manual-reset type must be placed in the out-of-view position manually. Neither will stay in place unless the pressure in the system is above the threshold. The photo to the left shows a manual wig wag which the operator swings to the right out of view when the air pressure is above the threshold where it will remain as long as the pressure is sufficient.

Most U.S. state commercial driver's license manuals, published by the states’ Departments of Motor Vehicles or equivalents, describe this term.

Advantages
Air brakes are used as an alternative to hydraulic brakes which are used on lighter vehicles such as automobiles. Hydraulic brakes use a liquid (hydraulic fluid) to transfer pressure from the brake pedal to the brake shoe to stop the vehicle. Air brakes are used in heavy commercial vehicles due to their reliability. They have several advantages for large multi-trailer vehicles:
 The supply of air is unlimited, so the brake system can never run out of its operating fluid, as hydraulic brakes can. Minor leaks do not result in brake failures.
 Air line couplings are easier to attach and detach than hydraulic lines; the risk of air getting into hydraulic fluid is eliminated, as is the need to bleed brakes when they are serviced.  Air-brake circuits on trailers can be easily attached and removed.  
 Air not only serves as a fluid for transmission of force, but also stores potential energy as it is compressed, so it can serve to control the force applied; hydraulic fluid is nearly incompressible.  Air-brake systems include an air tank that stores sufficient energy to stop the vehicle if the compressor fails.
 Air brakes are effective even with considerable leakage, so an air-brake system can be designed with sufficient "fail-safe" capacity to stop the vehicle safely even when leaking.
 The compressed air inherent in the system can be used for accessory applications that hydraulics are not appropriate for, such as air horns and seat adjusters, doors in case of buses and trolleybuses.

Disadvantages
Although air brakes are considered the superior braking system for heavy vehicles (gross weight ~12 tonnes to 15 tonnes) which would overload hydraulic brakes, they also have the following disadvantages when compared to hydraulic braking systems:
 Air brakes generally cost more.
 Air-brake systems compress air, which results in moisture that requires air dryers to remove, which also increases the price for air-brake systems and can contribute to higher maintenance and repair costs, particularly  in the first five years. Defective air dryers lead to ice in the air-brake system in cold locations.
 In the US, commercial drivers are required to obtain additional training in order to legally drive any vehicle using an air-brake system. The Federal Motor Carrier Safety Administration (FMCSA), which regulates the trucking industry in the US, requires that drivers who operate a vehicle equipped with air brakes take their driving test in one. This is because:
 Learning to operate air brakes smoothly has a learning curve, as they are difficult to operate smoothly.
 Also, since air brakes must be operated differently from hydraulic systems, driving a vehicle with air brakes requires knowledge of proper maintenance. A driver is required to inspect the air pressurization system prior to driving and make sure all tanks are in working order.
 As noted by the Insurance Corporation of British Columbia (ICBC), "Operating commercial vehicles or vehicles equipped with air brakes requires special knowledge and skill, and the cost of a mistake can be very high. When large vehicles are involved in crashes, the damage—to vehicles, cargo and human lives—can be catastrophic."
 Noise pollution: Ranging at 95–115 db for a typical noise level range with levels closer to 115–120 db able to cause immediate damage to hearing. Legislation in countries like Australia & Canada are in the midst of banning trucks with air brakes for use in heavily populated areas. The sound is created by the release of compressed air that has been trapped inside the brake chamber. The squeaking “psss" sound made is caused by air escaping after braking, ensuring air pressure remains at the correct level via opening of the valves reacting to the air compressor.

See also

 Air brake (aircraft)
 ArvinMeritor
 Gladhand connector
 Knorr-Bremse
 Ozone cracking
 Polymer degradation
 Railway air brake
 WABCO Vehicle Control Systems

References

External links
 
 Tractor Protection Systems. North American Standard Inspection Program, Commercial Vehicle Safety Alliance (May 19, 2010).

Vehicle braking technologies

de:Bremse (Kraftfahrzeug)#Druckluftbremse